Union-Chrétienne de Saint Chaumond is a French Catholic private international school for girls, located in Madrid, Spain. It serves petite section through terminale, the final year of lycée (senior high school/sixth form college).

References

External links
  Union-Chrétienne de Saint Chaumond
  Union-Chrétienne de Saint Chaumond

French international schools in Spain
International schools in Madrid
Private schools in Spain
Girls' schools in Spain